Abu Talib Muhammad Tughril ibn Mika'il, better known as Tughril (also spelled Toghril), was a Turkoman chieftain, who founded the Seljuk Empire, ruling from 1037 to 1063.

Tughril united many Turkoman warriors of the Central Asian steppes into a confederacy of tribes and led them in conquest of Khorasan and eastern Persia. He would later establish the Seljuk Sultanate after conquering Persia and taking the Abbasid capital of Baghdad from the Buyids in 1055. Tughril relegated the Abbasid Caliphs to state figureheads and took command of the caliphate's armies in military offensives against the Byzantine Empire and the Fatimids in an effort to expand his empire's borders and unite the Islamic world.

Before the advent of the Seljuks, Persia was divided between several warring local powers, such as the Saffarids, Buyids, Kakuyids, and Ghaznavids. As a result, it suffered from continuous war and destruction. However, under Tughril peace and prosperity were brought to the country and to Mesopotamia, a transition that was further reinforced due to the Seljuks' assimilation to Iranian-Muslim culture.

Name 

"Tughril" was the Old Turkic word for a bird of prey, possibly the Crested goshawk. In early Turkic history and culture, starting from the Uyghur Khaganate and onwards, it was used as a personal name.

Early life

After the death of his father Mikail, Tughril and his brother Chaghri were reportedly raised by their grandfather Seljuk (the eponymous founder of the Seljuks) in Jand. It was seemingly during this period that the Seljuk family converted to Islam, at least nominally. In the following decades, the Seljuks were employed as mercenaries under the warring factions of Transoxiana and Khwarazm, in exchange for pasture for their herds.

In the 1020s, Tughril and his other relatives were serving the Kara-Khanids of Bukhara. In 1026, the Kara-Khanids were driven out of Bukhara by the Ghaznavid Sultan Mahmud of Ghazni. Seljuk's son Arslan Isra'il fled to a place near Sarakhs, where he asked Mahmud for permission to settle in the area in return for military aid. Mahmud, however, had Arslan Isra'il put in prison, where the latter soon died. Meanwhile, Tughril and Chaghri remained loyal to their Kara-Khanid overlords, although there were disputes between them in 1029; in 1032, they fought alongside the Kara-Khanids at the Battle of Dabusiyya.

After the Kara-Khanid ruler Ali-Tegin's death, however, the Seljuks changed their allegiance to the ruler of Khwarazm, Harun, but were repelled by the Oghuz ruler Shah Malik in 1035. The Seljuks then went to the same place as Arslan Isra'il, and asked the son of Mahmud, Mas'ud I, for asylum. Mas'ud, however, considered the nomadic Turks to be dangerous and sent an army under his commander-in-chief Begtoghdi. The army was shortly defeated by the Seljuks, who forced Mas'ud to surrender Nasa, Farava and Dihistan in return for Seljuk recognition of Ghaznavid authority and protection of the region from other Turkic tribes.

In 1037, the Seljuks also forced the Ghaznavids to cede them Sarakhs, Abivard and Marw. The Seljuks then slowly began to subdue the cities of Khorasan, and, when they captured Nishapur, Tughril proclaimed himself Sultan of Khorasan.

Reign 

Mas'ud, after having returned to Khorasan, expelled the Seljuks from Herat and Nishapur. He soon marched towards Merv to completely remove the Seljuk threat from Khorasan. His army included 50,000 men and 12 to 60 war elephants.

The Battle of Dandanaqan shortly took place near Merv, where the army of Mas'ud was defeated by a much smaller army under Tughril, his brother Chaghri Beg, and the Kakuyid prince Faramurz. Mas'ud thus permanently lost control of all of western Khorasan. This victory marked the foundation of the Seljuk Empire, which was now rapidly expanding west.

Tughril then installed Chagri as the governor of Khorasan and prevented a Ghaznavid reconquest, then moved on to the conquest of the Iranian plateau from 1040 to 1044; in 1041–1042, Tughril conquered Tabaristan and Gurgan, and appointed a certain Mardavij ibn Bishui as the governor of the region. In 1042/3, he conquered Ray and Qazvin, and at the same his suzerainty was acknowledged by the Justanid ruler of Daylam. The Sallarid ruler of Shamiran also shortly acknowledged his overlordship. In 1054, Tughril forced the Rawadid ruler of Azerbaijan, Abu Mansur Wahsudan, to acknowledge his authority. Tughril's name was placed in the khutba (Friday prayer), while a son of Wahsudan, possibly Abu'l-Hayja Manuchihr, was sent as a Seljuk hostage to Khurasan. In the same year, Tughril's forces were contending in Anatolia with the Byzantines.

In 1055 he was commissioned by the Abbasid Caliph Al-Qa'im to recapture Baghdad from the Buyids. A revolt by Turcoman forces under his foster brother İbrahim Yinal and the efforts of Buyid forces led to the loss of the city to the Fatimid Caliph in 1058. Two years later Tughril crushed the rebellion, personally strangling İbrahim with his bowstring and entered Baghdad. He then married the daughter of the Abbasid Caliph near the city of Tabriz.

Death and succession
Tughril died on 4 October 1063 in Ray, at the age of seventy. Having no children, he had nominated his infant nephew Sulayman (a son of Chaghri Beg) as his successor. The vizier al-Kunduri supported this choice and may have been the one to suggest it to greatly expand his authority as the regent of the child. The succession was contested by Chaghri Beg's more competent and elder son Alp Arslan, who had ruled Khurasan since his father's death in 1059. Alp Arslan quickly asserted his authority over the whole empire, becoming the first Seljuk ruler to rule over both Tughril's and Chaghri's lands.

Family
One of his wives was Altun Jan Khatun. She was a Turkic woman, probably from Khwarazm, and had been married to Khwarazm Shah Shah Malik, with whom she had a son named Anushirvan. They married in around 1043. She died in 1061. Another wife was Akka Khatun. After Tughril's death, she married Alp Arslan. Another of his wives was the daughter of Abu Kalijar. They married in 1047–48. Another wife was the widow of his brother Chaghri Beg, and mother of his son, Suleiman. They married after Chaghri's death in 1060. Another wife was Sayida Khatun. She was the daughter of Abbasid Caliph Al-Qaim. In 1061, Tughril sent the qadi of Ray to Baghdad, to ask her hand in marriage to him. The marriage contract was concluded in August–September 1062 outside Tabriz, with a marriage proportion of one hundred thousand dinars. She was brought to the Sultan's palace in March–April 1063. After Tughril's death, Alp Arslan sent her back to Baghdad in 1064. In 1094, Caliph Al-Mustazhir compelled her to remain in her house lest she should intrigue for his overthrow. She died on 20 October 1102.

Legacy

Sultan Tughril was undoubtedly a military genius. Though his military campaigns inflicted serious damage on the productive forces of many conquered states, they paved the way for the establishment of the first powerful medieval empire of the Turks that linked "the East and the West". The formation of a vast empire objectively led to important changes in socio-economic, political and cultural life. The role of the landowning aristocracy markedly increased. Gradually, a new apparatus of state administration and an imperial system of civil and military administration took shape.

Tughril's conquests had an impact on the lives of not only the people of annexed states, but also the nomads themselves, who participated in the establishment of the new state. Noticeable changes in the life of the Oguz-Turkmen tribes occurred as they settled in Khorasan, Iran, Iraq, Syria, Transcaucasia and Asia Minor. The transition of compact groups of nomads to a semi-settled and sedentary life and agriculture took place. The old tribal ties broke up; feudal relations received a new incentive for further development, although remnants of archaic institutions remained for a long time. The Seljuk nobility began to gradually merge with the feudal aristocracy of the conquered lands.

References

Sources
 
 
 
 
 
 
 
 
 
 
 
 
 

990 births
1063 deaths
Seljuk rulers
11th-century Turkic people
Founding monarchs
Muslim monarchs
Shahanshahs